Nirma University (NU) is a multi-disciplinary university located in Ahmedabad, Gujarat, India. It functions under the aegis of the Nirma Education and Research Foundation (NERF). The Gujarat Government has granted "Centre of Excellence" status to Nirma University.

The university received the Centre for Excellence status from the Government of Gujarat in January 2022. The university has been recently awarded A+ grade by National Assessment and Accreditation Council (NAAC) in the third cycle of re-accreditation. This grade is a hallmark of very high academic quality, including education, research and extension.

Academics 

The Institute of Technology offers B. Tech. programmes. The Institute of Management offers postgraduate, doctoral and executive programmes in management. The Institute of Pharmacy offers pharmaceutical education at the undergraduate, postgraduate, doctoral and postdoctoral levels. The Institute of Science offers postgraduate programmes in M. Sc. in the fields biotechnology, biochemistry and microbiology.

Rankings
 
Internationally, Nirma University was ranked at 756 in the SCImago Institutions Rankings for 2020. The university was ranked in the 101–151 band among overall in India by the National Institutional Ranking Framework (NIRF) in 2020. It was also ranked 131 in the engineering ranking, 44 in the management ranking and 17 in the pharmacy ranking in 2020.

Notable alumni
Pranav Mistry, computer scientist
 Jay Shah, Secretary of Board of Control for Cricket in India and son of Amit Shah
 Minal Rohit, Indian Space Research Organisation scientist who worked on Mangalyaan

References

External links 
 

Universities in Ahmedabad
Science education in India
Private universities in India
Business schools in Gujarat
2003 establishments in Gujarat
Educational institutions established in 2003